Joyride: Remixes is a double CD, containing remixes of Mirah's material, by K Records artists. Released by K Records on November 21, 2006, it received a 3.5/5 from  Tiny Mix Tapes.

Production
Released by K Records on November 21, 2006, artists include Guy Sigsworth, Anna Oxygen, Tender Forever, Yacht, Mount Eerie, Khaela Maricich, Lucky Dragons and Electrosexual.

Reception

The album was positively received, receiving 3.5/5 from  Allmusic and 3/5 from Tiny Mix Tapes.

Track listing
Disc 1
"The Light" (Hooliganship) – 1:50
"La Familia" (Guy Sigsworth) – 2:53
"Monument" (Anna Oxygen) – 3:07
"Nobody Has to Stay" (Shawn Parke) – 2:21
"Don’t Die in Me" (Bryce Panic) – 3:47
"Apples in the Trees" (Pash) – 3:02
"Sweepstakes Prize" (Ben Adorable) – 4:36
"Make It Hot" (Tender Forever) – 3:15
"Advisory Committee" (Shok) – 4:32
"Dogs of B.A." (Krts) – 5:10
"Jerusalem" (Yacht) – 3:08

Disc 2
"Don’t Die in Me" (Mount Eerie) – 3:20
"The Fruits of Your Garden" (Khaela Maricich) – 2:15
"Mt. St. Helens" (Shawn Parke) – 3:45
"Make It Hot" (Yacht) – 2:52
"Pollen" (Lucky Dragons) – 3:16
"Cold Cold Water" (Electrosexual & Abberline) – 3:09
"Advisory Committee" (Emily Kingan) – 4:56
"La Familia" (Chris Baker) – 3:29
"We're Both So Sorry" (Scream Club) – 3:53
"The Light" (DJ Beyonda) – 3:19
"Apples in the Trees" (Bryce Panic) – 3:59

References

External links
MirahMusic.com

Mirah albums
2006 remix albums
K Records remix albums